Fraggle Rock: Back to the Rock is an American children's musical fantasy comedy puppet television series about interconnected societies of creatures, as a reboot of the original 1983 series Fraggle Rock by Jim Henson. The first season was released on Apple TV+ on January 21, 2022.

A holiday special Night of the Lights Holiday Special was released on November 18, 2022. It was renewed for a second season.

Plot
In the house belonging to a woman named Doc and her pet dog Sprocket, there is a hole that leads into Fraggle Rock. The Fraggles Gobo, Mokey, Wembley, Boober, and Red live their lives within Fraggle Rock while experiencing different adventures along the way as well as interacting with Doozers and avoiding the Gorgs while harvesting radishes.

Characters

Episodes

Season 1 (2022)

Special (2022)

Cast
 Lilli Cooper as Doc

Puppeteers
 John Tartaglia as Gobo Fraggle, Sprocket, Architect Doozer, Gunge, Barry Blueberry, and Lyle Craggle (puppetry only)
 Karen Prell as Red Fraggle, Icy Joe, and Merggle Queen (puppetry only)
 Donna Kimball as Mokey Fraggle, Cotterpin Doozer, and Storyteller Fraggle
 Jordan Lockhart as Wembley Fraggle, and Murray the Minstrel
 Frank Meschkuleit as Boober Fraggle (puppetry only), Uncle Traveling Matt (puppetry only in select episodes), The World's Oldest Fraggle (puppetry only), Pa Gorg (face and voice performance), Large Marvin Fraggle, and Mantivore
 Aymee Garcia as Ma Gorg (face and voice performance), Archivist (puppetry only), Marjorie the Trash Heap, Brool the Minstrel, Henchy Fraggle, Bongo, and Styles Craggle
 Dan Garza as Junior Gorg (face and voice performance), Philo, and Kyle Craggle
 Ali J. Eisner as Turbo Doozer, Jack Hammer Doozer (puppetry only), Joogie the Inkspot, and Balsam the Minstrel
 Kira Hall as Brio the Minstrel
 Kanja Chen as Pogey
 Kevin Clash as Uncle Traveling Matt (puppetry only in select episodes)
 Andy Hayward as Pa Gorg (in-suit performance), Wrench Doozer, Jamdolin (puppetry only), Rupert Fraggle, and Giant Talking Radish
 Ingrid Hansen as Ma Gorg (in-suit performance), and Skitter Stone
 Ben Durocher as Junior Gorg (in-suit performance)
 Anna Cummer as Additional puppeteer

Voices
 Dave Goelz as Boober Fraggle, Uncle Traveling Matt and The World's Oldest Fraggle
 Daveed Diggs as Jamdolin
 Cynthia Erivo as Archivist
 Ed Helms as Lyle Craggle
 Patti LaBelle as Merggle Queen
 Kenan Thompson as Jack Hammer Doozer

Production
The title cards of the original Fraggle Rock TV series states the puppet characters as "Jim Henson's Muppets". After The Jim Henson Company sold the Muppet franchise to The Walt Disney Company in 2004, the Fraggle Rock characters, which Henson retained, stopped being referred to as Muppets (though Fraggle Rock: Back to the Rock was co-produced by Regency Enterprises and 20th Century Studios's subsidiary New Regency, owned by The Walt Disney Company following its acquisition of 21st Century Fox's assets on March 20, 2019).

On May 26, 2020, following the success of the Fraggle Rock: Rock On! shorts that were released in April 2020, Apple TV+ announced a deal with The Jim Henson Company to produce a full reboot of Fraggle Rock, consisting of half-hour episodes, in addition to exclusive streaming rights to the original series and specials. In January 2021, The Jim Henson Company announced that production had officially started on a reboot of the show. The show is filmed at the Calgary Film Centre. Each episode features original songs, and reprises of songs from the original series.

Pre-production on the series began in late 2020 with the working title Raphanis (derived from the Latin word for "radish"). Filming commenced on January 25, 2021, in-studio at the Calgary Film Centre in Calgary, Alberta, Canada and wrapped in June.

In November 2020, a trailer revealed the Fraggle Rock: Back to the Rock title, and the January 21, 2022 premiere date.

Several original characters return, and new characters are voiced by celebrity guests, including Patti LaBelle, Cynthia Erivo, Daveed Diggs, Ed Helms, and Kenan Thompson. Foo Fighters make a cameo in one episode.

Reception
The show won Outstanding Art Direction at the 1st Children's and Family Emmy Awards and received three additional nominations for Best Children's or Family Viewing Series, Outstanding Cinematography and Outstanding Editing.

References

External links
 Fraggle Rock: Back to the Rock at Apple TV
 
 AppleTV+ Press

2020s American children's comedy television series
2020s American musical comedy television series
2022 American television series debuts
American children's adventure television series
American children's comedy television series
American children's fantasy television series
American children's musical television series
American television shows featuring puppetry
Apple TV+ original programming
English-language television shows
Fraggle Rock
Television series by The Jim Henson Company
Television series reboots
Television shows filmed in Calgary
Children's and Family Emmy Award winners